Dədəli (also, Dedeli) is a village and municipality in the Khachmaz Rayon of Azerbaijan.  It has a population of 1,542.  The municipality consists of the villages of Dədəli, Kiçik Baraxum, and Nağıoba.

References 

Populated places in Khachmaz District